Jorge Miguel Maglioni (born 28 December 1966) is an Argentine boxer. He competed in the men's featherweight event at the 1992 Summer Olympics.

References

1966 births
Living people
Argentine male boxers
Olympic boxers of Argentina
Boxers at the 1992 Summer Olympics
People from Río Negro Province
Featherweight boxers